Cyclosticta is a monotypic moth genus in the subfamily Arctiinae. Its single species, Cyclosticta discata, is found in Rio de Janeiro, Brazil. Both the genus and species were first described by Schaus in 1899.

References

Lithosiini